Monte Carlo is an administrative area of Monaco, famous for its Monte Carlo Casino gambling and entertainment complex.

Monte Carlo or Montecarlo may also refer to:

Places
 Monte Carlo Casino, Monte Carlo, Monaco
 Montecarlo, Tuscany, a town in Italy
 Montecarlo, Misiones, a town in Argentina
 Montecarlo, West Virginia, a coal town in the US
 Monte Carlo, Santa Catarina, a city in Brazil
 Monte Carlo Resort and Casino, a luxury hotel rebranded as Park MGM on the Las Vegas Strip, United States
 Monte Carlo (San Marino), a mountain with a monument to Gianni Widmer in San Marino

Sports
 Monte Carlo Rally, a rallying event organized by the Automobile Club de Monaco
 Monte-Carlo Masters, a tennis tournament
 Monte Carlo Open (golf), a defunct European Tour tournament (1984–1992)
 C.D. Monte Carlo, a football club in Macau
 Circuit de Monaco, a street circuit for Formula One automobile racing

Transportation
 Chevrolet Monte Carlo, an American automobile
 Lancia Montecarlo, an Italian automobile
 Monte Carlo (yacht), a 1988 motor yacht
 Several models of Saab cars;
 Saab 96 Monte Carlo, 1960s with tuned two stroke engine
 Saab 900 Monte Carlo and 
 Saab 9-3 Monte Carlo, limited editions in yellow color

Arts and entertainment
 Monte Carlo (arcade game), a 1979 racing game made by Atari
 Monte Carlo (musical), an 1896 West End musical by Howard Talbot
 Monte Carlo (radio programme), a Danish radio program
 Monte Carlo (solitaire), a solitaire card game
 "Monte Carlo" (song), a 2004 song by The Verve
 Monte Carlo (video game), a 1987 computer game
 CX 20 Radio Monte Carlo, a Uruguayan radio station

Film and television
 Monte Carlo (1921 film), a German silent film directed by Fred Sauer
 Monte Carlo (1925 film), a French silent film
 Monte Carlo (1926 film), an American romantic comedy silent film
 Monte Carlo (1930 film), an Ernst Lubitsch musical comedy
 Monte Carlo (2011 film), an American romantic comedy film starring Selena Gomez, Leighton Meester and Katie Cassidy
 Monte Carlo (miniseries), a 1986 TV miniseries starring Joan Collins
 Monte Carlo TV, a Uruguayan television channel

Science and technology
 Monte Carlo method, a class of computational algorithms
 Monte Carlo integration, a method of numerical integration
 Monte Carlo option model, an option valuation model using Monte Carlo methods
 Monte Carlo algorithm, a randomized algorithm
 Monte Carlo localization, an algorithm for robots to localize
 Monte Carlo molecular modeling, the application of Monte Carlo methods to molecular problems
 Monte Carlo method in statistical physics, the application of Monte Carlo methods to statistical physics
 Monte Carlo methods in finance, the application of Monte Carlo methods to finance

People
 Sophia Montecarlo (born 1986), former contestant on the reality show Born Diva
 Monte Carlo (composer) (1883–1967), Danish-born Broadway composer and author

Other uses
 Monte Carlo (biscuit), a biscuit trademark owned by Arnott's Biscuits Holdings
 Monte Carlo stock, a style of rifle buttstock